Zombor District (Bunjevac: Somborski okrug) was one of five administrative districts of the Voivodeship of Serbia and Temes Banat (a crown land within Austrian Empire) from 1850 to 1860. Its administrative center was Zombor (Serbian: Sombor).

History
The crown land Voivodeship of Serbia and Temes Banat was formed in 1849 and was initially divided into two districts: Batschka-Torontal and Temeschwar-Karasch. In 1850, crown land was divided into five districts and the territory of Batschka-Torontal District was divided among Neusatz District, Zombor District and Großbetschkerek District.

In 1860, the Voivodeship of Serbia and Temes Banat and its five districts were abolished and the territory of the Zombor District was administratively included into the Batsch-Bodrog County (part of the Austrian Kingdom of Hungary).

Geography
The Zombor District included northern parts of Bačka. It shared borders with the Neusatz District in the south, Großbetschkerek District in the east, Austrian Kingdom of Slavonia in the south-west, and Austrian Kingdom of Hungary in the north-west.

Demographics
According to 1850 census, the population of the Zombor district numbered 376,366 residents, including:
Hungarians = 160,016 (42.52%)
Germans = 103,886 (27.6%)
Bunjevci = 53,908 (14.32%)
Serbs = 40,054 (10.64%)
Jews = 7,830 (2.08%)

Cities and towns
Main cities and towns in the district were:
Abthausen (Apatin)
Ada an der Theiß (Ada)
Almasch (Almás)
Alt-Kanischa (Stara Kanjiža)
Batschka Topola (Bačka Topola)
Frankenstadt (Baja)
Jankovatz (Jankovácz)
Josephsfeld (Kula)
Maria-Theresiopel (Subotica)
Zenta (Senta)
Zombor (Sombor)

Most of the mentioned cities and towns are today in Serbia, while towns of Frankenstadt (Baja), Almasch (Almás) and Jankovatz (Jankovácz) are today in Hungary.

References

Further reading
Dr Saša Kicošev - Dr Drago Njegovan, Razvoj etničke i verske strukture Vojvodine, Novi Sad, 2010.
Dr Drago Njegovan, Prisajedinjenje Vojvodine Srbiji, Novi Sad, 2004.

See also
Sombor
Voivodeship of Serbia and Temes Banat

External links
Map of the District
Map of the District
Map of the District

 

Sombor
History of Bačka
Voivodeship of Serbia and Banat of Temeschwar